Eospilarctia huangshanensis is a moth of the family Erebidae first described by Cheng-Lai Fang in 2000. It is found in China (Anhui and Huangshan).

References

Moths described in 2000
Spilosomina